The 2013 Saskatchewan Roughriders season was the 56th season for the team in the Canadian Football League. The Roughriders improved upon their 8–10 record from 2012 and made the playoffs for the second straight season, while hosting their first playoff game since 2010. After defeating the BC Lions and Calgary Stampeders in the playoffs, the Roughriders qualified for their fourth Grey Cup appearance in seven years and first ever at their home stadium. The team defeated the Hamilton Tiger-Cats 45-23 in the 101st Grey Cup en route to winning the franchise's fourth championship. With the added seats at Mosaic Stadium at Taylor Field, the Roughriders led the league in attendance for the first time, with an average of 37,503 fans attending each regular season game.

Offseason

Coaches
The Riders began their offseason coaching changes by releasing defensive line coach Mike Walker, linebackers coach Alex Smith, and offensive line coach Kris Sweet. The team hired former Alouettes assistant coach Mike Sinclair to be the defensive line and assistant head coach, but he later joined Marc Trestman's staff with the Chicago Bears. Special teams coordinator Craig Dickenson also resigned with the club, moving to the Winnipeg Blue Bombers, while Bob Dyce moved into that role from the offensive coordinator position. Arguably, the team's biggest coaching hire was Dyce's replacement, George Cortez, the former head coach and coordinator for the Tiger-Cats, whose team led the league in points scored. They also hired Richard Kent to be another defensive backs coach and Doug Malone and Todd Howard to be the offensive and defensive line coaches, respectively.

Players
On January 24, 2013, the Riders traded Justin Harper and a 2014 4th round pick to the BC Lions for six-time all-star and two-time Grey Cup champion Geroy Simon. Simon had been a member of the Lions since 2001.

The Roughriders were also lauded for signing many big name free agents, including the 2009 Most Outstanding Canadian and the 100th Grey Cup's Most Valuable Canadian, Ricky Foley. They also signed defensive backs Dwight Anderson, Weldon Brown, and linebacker Tristan Black.

On June 1, 2013, former Roughriders defensive end John Chick, who was released by the Jacksonville Jaguars of the NFL, signed with the Roughriders after much speculation.

CFL draft
The 2013 CFL Draft took place on May 6, 2013. The Roughriders had seven selections total in the seven-round draft, after trading away their second round pick during a 2012 draft trade and their fourth round pick in a trade for Greg Carr. Their third round pick was traded to Toronto for three fifth round picks.

Preseason

Regular season

Season standings

Season schedule

Game summaries

Week 1: at Edmonton Eskimos

The Roughriders started their season in Edmonton, getting impressive performances from Darian Durant and Kory Sheets, in a dominating 39-18 win against the Eskimos. Durant completed 14 passes for 171 yards and three touchdowns, which was the third time in five games in his career that he passed for at least three touchdowns and no interceptions in the opening game of a season. Sheets had 17 rushes for a career best 131 yards and a touchdown while Renauld Williams gave the Riders a comfortable lead with an interception return for a touchdown on the last play of the first half to make the score 22-1 at the half. The game was the sixth time in the last seven seasons that the Roughriders won their opening game of the season. It was also the team's first win in Edmonton since September 26, 2009 and their first road victory against a west division opponent since July 10, 2010, ending a 14-game losing streak.

Week 2: vs Calgary Stampeders

In Week 2, the Roughriders found outstanding performances from receivers Chris Getzlaf, Weston Dressler and once again Durant and Sheets, in a 36-21 win over the Stampeders. Dressler had 10 catches for 108 yards and a touchdown while Getzlaf had eight receptions for 97 yards and a major of his own. Sheets set another career high with 133 rushing yards, and the Roughriders became the only team in the CFL to be undefeated, which is the first time since 2006 that there is only one undefeated team after two weeks. Saskatchewan dominated the time-of-possession, especially in the second half, where the Roughriders had the ball for close to 22 minutes compared to the Stampeders' eight, leading to a defensive shut out for Saskatchewan in the second half. With the temporary seating installed for the 101st Grey Cup, it was the largest opening day crowd and fourth largest overall in franchise history with 35,296 fans in the stands.

Week 3: at Toronto Argonauts

In Week 3, the Roughriders played defending Grey Cup champions Toronto Argonauts. Durant continued his outstanding start to the season as he completed 14 of 19 passes for 245 yards and three touchdowns before leaving early in the fourth quarter with an apparent ankle injury. He begins the season with eight touchdowns with no interceptions and a 72.0% completion rate. Kory Sheets recorded yet another career high with 178 rushing yards, which was his third 100-yard rushing game after recording three all of last year. Taj Smith had the first 100-yard receiving game of his career with three catches for 141 yards and two touchdowns. Rob Bagg recorded his first touchdown catch since September 25, 2010 following knee injuries that kept him out of most of the last two seasons. It was also Durant's 100th career touchdown pass. Remarkably, the Roughriders didn't record a turnover until the fourth quarter with 23 seconds left on a muffed onside kick return, which was the team's first turnover of the season. The Roughriders had a 3-0 record to start the season for the fourth time in the last six years.

Week 4: vs Hamilton Tiger-Cats

Former Roughriders quarterback and head coach Kent Austin, who led the Roughriders to the 1989 Grey Cup as a player and the 2007 Grey Cup as a head coach, returned to Mosaic Stadium as the head coach and general manager of the Hamilton Tiger-Cats for the first time since the 2007 Grey Cup victory. After sustaining a foot injury, Darian Durant was a game-time decision and excelled, passing for 347 yards and four touchdowns, which was the first time he passed for four touchdowns since a 2012 week one victory over the Tiger-Cats. Rob Bagg led all receivers with 125 receiving yards and two touchdowns, which was his first 100-yard and multi-touchdown performance since a 2010 game, once again against the Tiger-Cats. Offensive lineman Dan Clark scored his first touchdown on a pass from Durant and Kory Sheets recorded his fourth straight 100-yard rushing game, which was the best four-game start in CFL history with 572 rushing yards. The Roughriders recorded a 4-0 start to the season for only the fourth time in franchise history in the modern era of Canadian football.

Week 5: at Hamilton Tiger-Cats

Leading up to their week 5 game against the Hamilton Tiger-Cats, there was again speculation that Durant may not play due to his foot injury sustained against the Argos. As a game-time decision, Drew Willy made his third professional start and first of the season as he completed 14 of 25 passes for 269 yards and three touchdowns en route to the Roughriders' fifth straight win to open the season. Kory Sheets rushed for 140 yards and became the first player in CFL history to rush for over 100 yards in each of the first five games to start the season. He also set a franchise record for consecutive 100-yard rushing games with five, surpassing the previous records held by George Reed (1969) and Mike Strickland (1978). Geroy Simon led all receivers with 125 receiving yards and scored his first touchdown as a Roughrider and the 101st touchdown reception of his career. John Chick recorded his first sack since returning to the Roughriders and Tearrius George had his first multi-sack game since 2007, matching his career high with three.

Week 6: Bye week

Week 7: at Calgary Stampeders

The Roughriders suffered their first loss following the bye week to the Calgary Stampeders, leaving the season series split at one game apiece and setting up a rubber match in week 18. After not allowing more than 100 yards rushing in any game in the first five weeks, the Roughriders defense gave up 223 yards including 175 by Jon Cornish to go along with his four rushing touchdowns. While trailing by six points in the third quarter, kick returner Jock Sanders made the peculiar decision to return a kick from the one-yard line, resulting in a safety two plays later followed by a touchdown by Calgary on the ensuing drive, putting the game out of reach. Saskatchewan came into the game as the second-least penalized team, but committed a season-high 10 fouls for 126 yards. Individually, Kory Sheets had eight rushing yards in the first half, but finished strong with 133 total rushing yards by the end of the game, extending his 100-yard game streak to six. Sheets also committed the first offensive turnover of the year for the Roughriders after he fumbled in the first quarter. Darian Durant again had a strong game, passing for three touchdowns, increasing his league-leading total to 15, while having yet to record an interception.

Week 8: vs Montreal Alouettes

With a sellout 40,637 in attendance at Mosaic Stadium at Taylor Field, the Saskatchewan Roughriders tried to get back on track after suffering their first loss of the 2013 season to Calgary. In the first quarter, Darian Durant found Weston Dressler for a touchdown and later would eclipse the 20,000 passing yards mark for his CFL career. Early in the second quarter, Ricky Foley would injure Alouettes quarterback Anthony Calvillo, forcing Calvillo sit out the rest of the game. Riders returner Jock Sanders suffered two fumbles in the game, making Dressler and Weldon Brown take over for punt and kickoff returns respectively. Rob Bagg would exit the game after an apparent lower body injury. Longtime CFL receiver Geroy Simon caught his 1,000th career reception, becoming only the third CFL player to do so. With the score tied 14-14, Alouettes' defensive back Jerald Brown recovered a fumble by Durant and returned it for a touchdown late in the 4th quarter, but Durant responded with a 65-yard touchdown toss to Taj Smith, tying the game again. Following a Montreal two-and-out, Dressler returned the ensuing punt 38 yards, setting up Christopher Milo's 36-yard game-winning field goal. This was the first game of the season in which Kory Sheets did not rush for over 100 yards.

Week 9: at Edmonton Eskimos

Following below average performances by Darian Durant and Kory Sheets in week 8, both players got back on track against the Edmonton Eskimos to lead their team to victory. Durant completed 80% of his passes for 334 yards, which is the highest completion percentage in a start during his CFL career. While he didn't throw an interception for the seventh straight start, he also didn't throw a touchdown pass, which was the first time he had not thrown at least two touchdown passes during this streak. This was probably due to Sheets scoring both of Saskatchewan's touchdowns on rushes, where he ran for 139 yards en route to becoming the fastest player to reach 1,000 yards rushing to start a season, doing so in the first eight games. Geroy Simon passed 16,000 yards receiving in his career and Christopher Milo connected on all five of his field goal attempts to keep him perfect on the season. The game saw seven lead changes, but the defense made big plays in the fourth quarter. Dwight Anderson recorded his second interception of the season with Edmonton on the Saskatchewan 4-yard line and trailing only by two points. After a Ricky Schmitt single on the ensuing drive to give the Roughriders a three-point lead, Weldon Brown forced Edmonton quarterback Mike Reilly to fumble on the next Eskimo drive to seal the Saskatchewan victory. The Roughriders have a 7-1 record for only the second time in franchise history, with the first being in 1970 when that team finished 14-2.

Week 10: vs Winnipeg Blue Bombers

The Roughriders hosted the second largest crowd in franchise history with a sellout crowd of 44,910 fans at Mosaic Stadium to witness a 48-25 win over their arch-rival Winnipeg Blue Bombers. After being down by four points at half-time, the Roughriders outscored the Blue Bombers 34-7 en route to their ninth straight Labour Day Classic victory. Darian Durant threw his first interception of the season to Winnipeg's Henoc Muamba, but responded by throwing four touchdown passes thereafter to go along with his third 300-yard game of 2013. Kory Sheets missed the 100-yard rushing mark for just the second time of the season, but recorded the best nine game start in CFL history with 1,149 rushing yards. On defense, Dwight Anderson recorded an interception for the third consecutive game and John Chick had his first multi-sack game since the 2009 Labour Day Classic. The win improved the Riders' record to 8-1 which is the best nine-game start in franchise history.

Week 11: at Winnipeg Blue Bombers

Week 12: vs Toronto Argonauts

Week 13: vs BC Lions

Week 14: at Montreal Alouettes

Week 15: at BC Lions

Week 16: vs Edmonton Eskimos

Week 17: vs BC Lions

Week 18: at Calgary Stampeders

Week 19: vs Edmonton Eskimos

Team

Roster

Coaching staff

Playoffs

Schedule

Game summaries

West Semi-Final: vs BC Lions

West Final: at Calgary Stampeders

Grey Cup: vs Hamilton Tiger-Cats

References

Saskatchewan Roughriders seasons
Sask
Grey Cup championship seasons